GIPC PDZ domain containing family, member 2 (GIPC2) is a protein that, in humans, is encoded by the GIPC2 gene.

See also
GIPC PDZ domain containing family, member 2, GIPC1

GIPC PDZ domain containing family, member 3, GIPC3

References

Further reading